Efe Halİl Özarslan (born 29 March 1990) is a Turkish former professional footballer who played as a defender.

References

External links 
 TFF profile
 
 Efe Özarslan at Footballdatabase

1990 births
Living people
Association football defenders
Turkish footballers
Gençlerbirliği S.K. footballers
Ankara Demirspor footballers
Hacettepe S.K. footballers
Bucaspor footballers
Mersin İdman Yurdu footballers
Süper Lig players
Turkey youth international footballers